Luscombe Airfield was an airfield at Nui Dat, Phước Tuy province, South Vietnam (now in Bà Rịa–Vũng Tàu province, Vietnam). The airfield was built by 1 Field Squadron, Royal Australian Engineers for the 1st Australian Task Force at Nui Dat. The airfield was opened on 5 December 1966 and named in honour of Captain Bryan Luscombe, who had been killed in action during the Korean War on 5 June 1952.

References
https://web.archive.org/web/20100702022241/http://www.1fieldsappers.org/files/page.php?p=21
http://www.161recceflt.org.au/Airfield/luscombe_airfield.htm

Airports in Vietnam
Vietnam War military installations
Buildings and structures in Bà Rịa-Vũng Tàu province
Military history of Australia during the Vietnam War